Conception of the Blessed Virgin Mary may refer to:

The Roman Catholic Feast of the Immaculate Conception (celebrated December 8)
The Orthodox Christian Conception of the Virgin Mary (celebrated December 9)
The Anglican Communion Conception of the Blessed Virgin Mary (celebrated December 8)